The 2020 Mississippi State Bulldogs softball team represents Mississippi State University in the 2020 NCAA Division I softball season. The Bulldogs play their home games at Nusz Park.

Previous season

The Bulldogs finished the 2019 season 35–23 overall, and 9–15 in the SEC to finish in twelfth in the conference. The Bulldogs went 2–2 in the Seattle Regional during the 2019 NCAA Division I softball tournament.

Preseason

SEC preseason poll
The SEC preseason poll was released on January 15, 2020.

Schedule and results

Source:
*Rankings are based on the team's current ranking in the NFCA poll.

Rankings

References

Mississippi State
Mississippi State Bulldogs softball seasons
Mississippi State Bulldogs softball